is a fixed shooter arcade video game developed by Shin Nihon Kikaku (SNK) and released in 1979. The background gives the impression of vertical scrolling, but the player ship's movement is restricted to the bottom of the screen.

Gameplay
The player controls a spacecraft which must fend off UFOs, meteors, and comets. Instead of lives, the player is given an energy reserve that is constantly diminishing; getting hit by the enemy causes gameplay to stop momentarily and a large amount of energy is depleted. Every so often, a mothership will appear and dock with the player's spacecraft, allowing the energy to be refilled. There are 3–4 recognizable stages as the game progresses and new enemies begin to appear. After these, the mothership will appear, and the cycle starts over; this continues indefinitely until the energy reaches zero.

Due to the game being monochrome and a conversion kit for Space Invaders, many Ozma Wars monitors used the Space Invaders color overlay.

Legacy
There are two bootleg versions of this game called Space Phantoms and Solar Flight. In Space Phantoms the player's ship looks like an angel, and the enemies appear as different types of insect.

References

External links

Ozma Wars at System-16
Ozma Wars at the Arcade-history Database
Detailed page in japanese on Ozma Wars

1979 video games
Arcade video games
Fixed shooters
SNK games
PlayStation Network games
Video games developed in Japan